Douglas Robert Putman (born 25 March 1984) is a billionaire Canadian business executive. Putman is the owner of Canadas largest toy chain, Toys R Us, music retailer Sunrise Records, the owner of FYE the largest pop culture chain in the USA, Everest Toys and the owner of hmv UK. As well as many other companies.

Early life
Douglas Putman was born on 25 March 1984 and raised in Ancaster, Ontario. His family owned Everest Toys,  which he managed as of 2017.

Career
In 2017, it was announced that Putman had acquired the lease agreements for HMV Canada after it fell into receivership at which time he expanded Sunrise Records Canada-wide. The former subsidiary of HMV UK is now operating as Sunrise Records. On 5 February 2019, HMV UK was acquired by Sunrise Records, owned by Putman, for £883,000, saving 100 stores and 1,600 jobs. The company will continue to trade under the HMV brand.

In 2021, Putman, through his Putman Investments, announced he would buy Toys "R" Us Canada from Fairfax Financial.

References

1984 births
Living people
Businesspeople from Ontario
Canadian chief executives
People from Hamilton, Ontario